Guangzong County is under the jurisdiction of the prefecture-level city of Xingtai in the south of Hebei province, China.

Administrative divisions
The county administers 1 towns and 7 townships.

The only town is Guangzong

Townships:
Dapingtai Township, Dongzhao Township, Jianzhi Township, Hetaoyuan Township, Hulu Township, Beitangtuan Township, Fengjiazhai Township

Climate

References

External links
Romance of the Three Kingdoms/Chapter 1

County-level divisions of Hebei